Cliffy Island is an island peak, of a submerged granite mountain approximately 20 km off the coast of Victoria, Australia.  It is the home of the Cliffy Island Lighthouse which is only accessible by helicopter.  The island is part of the Wilsons Promontory Islands Important Bird Area, identified as such by BirdLife International because of its importance for breeding seabirds.

Travelling around the island by boat, remnants of what appear to be an old jetty, train tracks and a large engine for dragging supplies up the steep incline to the lighthouse keepers compound are clearly visible. The island and those that surround it are a haven for many seals.

References

Islands of Victoria (Australia)
Important Bird Areas of Victoria (Australia)